McMillen or MacMillen is a surname. The origin of the name derives from the origin of the Scottish Clan MacMillan; see also the similar surname McMillan. Notable people with the surname include:

Andrew McMillen (born c. 1988), Australian journalist
Billy McMillen (1920–1975), Irish republican
Bob McMillen (born 1928), American athlete
Bob McMillen (born 1970), American football player and coach
Clara McMillen (1898–1982), American biologist
Dale W. McMillen (1880–1971), American businessman
Edmund McMillen (born 1980), American video game designer
Jim McMillen (1902–1984), American football player
Loring McMillen (1906–1991), American engineer and historian
Louis A. McMillen (1916–1998), American architect
Neil R. McMillen, American historian
Rolla C. McMillen (1880–1961), American politician
Thomas Roberts McMillen (1916–2002), American judge
Tom McMillen (born 1952), American basketball player and politician
Walter McMillen (1913–1987), Northern Irish footballer
William L. McMillen (1829–1902), American physician and politician

See also
Moore-McMillen House, historic home on Staten Island, New York, United States
McMillen High School, high school in Texas, United States